General Sir Anthony Stephen Jeremy Blacker KCB CBE (6 May 1939 – 17 March 2005) was a Master-General of the Ordnance.

Military career
Educated at Sherborne School, Corpus Christi College, Cambridge and the Royal Military Academy Sandhurst, Blacker was commissioned into the Royal Tank Regiment in 1959. He was deployed to Northern Ireland in 1974 at the height of the Troubles.

In 1979 he was appointed Commanding Officer of 1st Royal Tank Regiment and in 1981 he became Director of Studies at the Royal Military College of Science. In 1982 he was appointed Commander of 11th Armoured Brigade in Germany and then in 1985 he became Principal Staff Officer to the Chief of Defence Staff. In 1987 he returned to the Royal Military College of Science as Commandant and in 1989 he became Assistant Chief of Defence Staff. In 1991 he was appointed Master-General of the Ordnance; in this role he managed the introduction of the AS-90 self-propelled gun. He retired in 1995.

He was also Colonel Commandant of the Royal Electrical and Mechanical Engineers, of the Royal Tank Regiment and of the Royal Armoured Corps.

Family
In 1973 he married Julia Mary Trew and together they went on to have two daughters.

His aunt was the painter, Elva Blacker.

References

|-
 

1939 births
2005 deaths
Graduates of the Royal Military Academy Sandhurst
British Army generals
Knights Commander of the Order of the Bath
Commanders of the Order of the British Empire
Royal Tank Regiment officers
People educated at Sherborne School
Alumni of Corpus Christi College, Cambridge
British military personnel of The Troubles (Northern Ireland)